American animation is animation created in the United States or by American animators.

History
 Animation in the United States during the silent era
 Golden age of American animation
 World War II and American animation
 Animation in the United States in the television era
 Modern animation in the United States

By genre
 Adult animation in the United States

References